Katherine Foster  may refer to:

Kathryn Foster, American soap opera director
Kathy Foster (basketball), Australian basketball player

See also
Kathy Foster (disambiguation)
Kathleen Foster (disambiguation)
Foster (surname)